Diplomatic missions in Israel are foreign embassies and consulates in Israel. There are currently 94 embassies in Israel, of which 90 embassies are located in Tel Aviv and the Tel Aviv District, and four are located in Jerusalem. In addition to an embassy, some countries also maintain a consulate in Eilat, Haifa or Jerusalem.

On 6 December 2017 the President of the United States, Donald Trump announced that the US embassy to Israel would be moved to Jerusalem. The move was made on 14 May 2018.  In April 2018, Guatemala announced that their embassy would move to Jerusalem, which it did the following month. Honduras followed in June 2021. Brazil has reflected on moving the Embassy to Jerusalem, as well, along with Hungary, Moldova, and Romania. Paraguay's embassy was briefly located in Jerusalem in 2018, then returned to Tel Aviv after a few months. Others have vowed to make the move, including Armenia, Uganda, Rwanda, and Serbia. Suriname refused to move their embassy. A few other countries have opened official Trade and Defense offices and branches of their embassies, such as Hungary and Australia.

Twelve countries operate Honorary Consulates accredited to Israel in Jerusalem, and 9 countries operate consulates in Jerusalem accredited for the West Bank and Gaza Strip. These are not regarded as diplomatic missions to Israel yet are located within Jerusalem municipal boundary.

Embassies

Jerusalem

Tel Aviv and metropolitan area 

 (Ramat Gan)

 (Herzliya)

 (Ramat Gan)

 

 (Ramat Gan)

   (Ramat Gan)

 (Ramat Gan)
 (Herzliya)

 (Herzliya)

 (Ramat Gan)

 

 (Ramat Gan)

 (Ramat Gan)

 (Ramat Gan)

 (Ramat Gan)

 (Ramat Gan)

 (Ramat Gan)

 (Ramat Gan)
 (Herzliya)

Diplomatic offices in Jerusalem 
Several states maintain, or have announced their intention to establish, trade or cultural offices in Jerusalem, some of which have diplomatic status as extensions of their embassy outside the city. Most of these missions followed the relocation of the U.S. Embassy to Jerusalem in 2019: 

 (Trade and Defense Office)
  (Trade office)
 (Trade office)
 (Embassy Branch Office)
 (Innovation Office)
 (Representative Office)
 (Cultural Office)
 (Trade office)
 (Innovation Office: Italian Center)
 (commercial office)
 (Trade Office)
 (Cultural Office: Slovak Institute)
 (Diplomatic Office)
 (business office)

Gallery

Embassies to open 

 (Tel Aviv)
 (Tel Aviv)
 (Tel Aviv)
 (Tel Aviv)

Countries that intend to establish an embassy in Jerusalem

Consulates-General

Beer Sheva
 (Vice Consulate)

Eilat

Haifa
 
 
 
 - to open

Other Missions in Jerusalem
These are the list of countries that operate consulates within the Jerusalem municipal boundary but are accredited to the city of Jerusalem, West Bank and Gaza Strip only. These missions are not directly accredited to the Palestinian Authority and also not to Israel. Between 1844 and 2019, the United States maintained a consulate-general in Jerusalem that conducted relations with the Palestinians. In March 2019, the Consulate General was merged into the new US Embassy in Jerusalem and many of its responsibilities were assumed by the Embassy's new Palestinian Affairs Unit. Countries listed below already maintain separate embassies to Israel. For diplomatic missions accredited to the Palestinian Authority directly located inside the Palestinian territories of West Bank and Gaza Strip, see: List of diplomatic missions in Palestine.

 (Apostolic Delegation)

Tel Aviv
  (Embassy branch office)

Economic and Representative Offices
 (UNHCR Representative) – Tel Aviv
 (Delegation) – Tel Aviv
 – Tel Aviv
 (Delegation) – Tel Aviv and Jerusalem
 (Representative Office)
 (Trade and Investment Office) – Tel Aviv
 (Liaison Office) – Tel Aviv

Non-resident embassies
Resident in Ankara, Turkey:
 
 
 
 
 

Resident in Cairo, Egypt:
 
 
 
 
 
 
 

Resident in London, United Kingdom:
 
 
 
 
 

Resident in Paris, France:
 
 
 
 
 

Resident in Rome, Italy:
 
 
 

Other Resident Cities:
  (New Delhi)
  (Addis Ababa)
  (Washington D.C.)
  (Addis Ababa)
  (Chicago)
  (Stockholm)
  (Berlin)
  (Suva)
  (Brussels)
  (Nairobi)
  (Ramallah)
  (New York City)

Closed missions

See also
Foreign relations of Israel
List of Consulates-General in Jerusalem
List of diplomatic missions of Israel
Israeli passport
Visa policy of Israel
Visa requirements for Israeli citizens

References

External links
Israeli Ministry of Foreign Affairs

Israel
Diplomatic missions